Remi Broadway (born 30 April 1978) is an Australian actor best known as Rupert Pringle from The Wayne Manifesto, and Piffy the bell ringer from The Late Show, which parodied his earlier appearance on the talent show Pot Luck.

Biography
He is the son of former juggler Johnny Broadway and French-born actress and TV presenter Christine Broadway. 

He hosted an Australian children's television show, Prime Possum Show on the Prime Television Network.  After appearing in about 550 episodes, before leaving in 1996 to pursue a Hollywood career.

He also appeared in the cult movie Rapid Fear along with Peter Kent and Vanja Matula. He produced and directed Choose Your Own Tube, a serial on YouTube featuring Caitlin Hill and his brother Regis Broadway.

In July 2011, Broadway opened Central, a lounge and dining bar in Surfers Paradise on the Gold Coast in Queensland, Australia.

Filmography

References

External links
Official Website 

YouTube Profile
Choose Your Own Tube official website
Rapid Fear on IMDb

1978 births
Living people
Australian male television actors